Lucie Pudilová (born June 13, 1994) is a Czech female mixed martial artist who competes in the Bantamweight division of the Ultimate Fighting Championship (UFC).  She was the Gladiator Championship Fighting Bantamweight female champion in Czech Republic.

Background

Pudilová started training MMA when she was 16 years old. She worked with her coach, Ladislav Erdélyi, to achieve her goal of fighting in the UFC.

Mixed martial arts career

Early career
Pudilová fought most of her early MMA career in Europe. Her win over Melinda Fábián, an The Ultimate Fighter 26 contestant, earned her the title of Bantamweight Champion for the Gladiator Championship Fighting promotion in Czech Republic. Pudilová amassed a record of 6-1 prior to being signed by UFC, with the one loss to Lina Länsberg. Pudilová is the third Czech to be signed by UFC.

Ultimate Fighting Championship
Pudilová made her promotion debut on March 18, 2017, replacing injured Veronica Macedo, at UFC Fight Night: Manuwa vs. Anderson against Lina Länsberg in a rematch in London. After three close rounds of fierce fighting, she lost the fight via unanimous decision. At the post fight interview, Länsberg, with a badly battered right eye, argued that she might think Pudilová had done enough to be declared the winner. However, a majority of the media score cards still agreed with the judges and saw Länsberg as the winner.

Her second fight came on June 17, 2017 in Singapore at UFC Fight Night: Holm vs. Correia. She faced Ji Yeon Kim and won the fight via unanimous decision.

Pudilová faced Sarah Moras on February 18, 2018 at UFC Fight Night: Cowboy vs. Medeiros. She won the fight by unanimous decision.

Pudilová faced Irene Aldana on September 8, 2018 at UFC 228. She lost the close fight via split decision.  This fight earned her the Fight of the Night award.

Pudilová faced Liz Carmouche on February 23, 2019 at UFC on ESPN+ 3. She lost the fight by unanimous decision.

Pudilová faced Antonina Shevchenko on August 3, 2019 at UFC on ESPN 5. She lost the fight via technical submission due to a rear-naked choke in the second round. Despite the loss, the bout earned Pudilová her second Fight of the Night bonus award.

Pudilová faced Justine Kish on January 25, 2020 at UFC Fight Night 166. She lost he fight via unanimous decision.

Pudilová was released by the UFC on February 11, 2020.

Regional circuit
After her release from the UFC, Pudilová returned to the European regional circuit. She entered a tournament organized under the banner of a Czech promotion Oktagon MMA, "Underground". All fights in the tournament were officially recorded as exhibition bouts, with 3 minute rounds and a slightly modified ruleset. In the quarterfinals round she faced an 18 year old amateur fighter Tereza Bledá, in a main event at Oktagon Underground 3 held on May 25, 2020. She lost the fight by unanimous decision, getting eliminated from the tournament. With this loss, her losing streak was extended to 5.

Pudilová was scheduled to face Maguy Berchel on August 19, 2020 at Noc Bojovníků in Dobříš. However, a few days before the event Berchel reacted with confusion to a social media post about the match, and subsequently claimed that the fight with Pudilová was never offered to her. The event's promoter maintained that the bout was set up and agreed upon with Berchel's management. It was announced that a replacement is being sought for Pudilová, but the event was eventually cancelled altogether due to restrictions related to the COVID-19 pandemic.

Oktagon MMA 
In October 2020, it was announced that Pudilová signed a contract with the Czech promotion Oktagon MMA.

She was scheduled to face Marta Waliczek at Oktagon 18 on November 21, 2020. The bout was later cancelled, as Waliczek withdrew due to illness.

She then faced Cornelia Holm at Oktagon 19 on December 5, 2020. She won the fight via unanimous decision.

The cancelled bout with Waliczek was rescheduled and took place at Oktagon 21 on January 30, 2021. She won the fight via controversial split decision.

Pudilová then faced Maiju Suotama at Oktagon 22 on March 27, 2021, as a short notice replacement for Marta Waliczek. She won the fight via unanimous decision.

Pudilová faced fellow former UFC fighter, Talita Bernardo, on July 24, 2021 at OKTAGON 26.
She lost the one-sided bout via unanimous decision.

A rematch with Waliczek took place on November 6, 2021 at Oktagon Prime 4. Pudilová won via split decision. In preparation for this fight, she trained at Straight Blast Gym Ireland with coach John Kavanagh.

Pudilová was scheduled to face former Bellator title challenger Olga Rubin on February 26, 2022, at OKTAGON 31. However, Rubin withdrew from the fight due to an injury and was replaced by Priscila de Souza, who was originally slated to fight Cornelia Holm at the same event. At the weigh-ins, De Souza came in 3.7 pounds over the non-title fight limit at bantamweight. After failing to make weight on her second attempt, Pudilová's team decided not to accept a catchweight and the fight was scrapped from the card.

Pudilová faced Carol Yariwaki on April 9, 2022 at Oktagon 32. She won the bout via unanimous decision.

Return to UFC 
After going 5-1 after her UFC release, fighting for the Oktagon promotion in her native Czech Republic, Pudilová re-signed with the UFC.

Pudilová faced Wu Yanan on August 20, 2022 at UFC 278. She won the bout via TKO stoppage in the second round due to elbows on the ground.

Pudilová is scheduled to face Joselyne Edwardson April 15, 2023 at UFC on ESPN 44.

Championships and accomplishments

Mixed martial arts
Ultimate Fighting Championship
Fight of the Night (Two times) 
Gladiator Championship Fighting
Gladiator Championship Fighting Bantamweight Champion (One time) vs. Melinda Fabián

Personal life
Prior to being a professional fighter, Pudilová was a student at the Business Middle School in Czech Republic.

Mixed martial arts record

|-
|Win
|align=center|14–7
|Wu Yanan
|TKO (elbows)
|UFC 278
|
|align=center|2
|align=center|4:04
|Salt Lake City, Utah, United States
|
|-
|Win
|align=center|13–7
|Carol Yariwaki
|Decision (unanimous)
|OKTAGON 32
|
|align=center|3
|align=center|5:00
|Ostrava, Czech Republic
|
|-
|Win
|align=center|12–7
|Marta Waliczek
|Decision (split)
|Oktagon Prime 4
|
|align=center|3
|align=center|5:00
|Pardubice, Czech Republic
|
|-
|Loss
|align=center|11–7
|Talita Bernardo
|Decision (unanimous)
|OKTAGON 26
|
|align=center|3
|align=center|5:00
|Prague, Czech Republic
|
|-
|Win
|align=center|11–6
|Maiju Suotama
|Decision (unanimous)
|OKTAGON 22 
|
|align=center|3
|align=center|5:00
|Brno, Czech Republic
|
|-
|Win
|align=center|10–6
|Marta Waliczek
|Decision (split)
|OKTAGON 21 
|
|align=center|3
|align=center|5:00
|Brno, Czech Republic
|
|-
|Win
|align=center|9–6
|Cornelia Holm
|Decision (unanimous)
|OKTAGON 19 
|
|align=center|3
|align=center|5:00
|Brno, Czech Republic
|
|-
|Loss
|align=center|8–6
|Justine Kish
|Decision (unanimous)
|UFC Fight Night: Blaydes vs. dos Santos 
|
|align=center|3
|align=center|5:00
|Raleigh, North Carolina, United States
|
|-
|Loss
|align=center|8–5
|Antonina Shevchenko
|Technical Submission (rear-naked choke)
|UFC on ESPN 5
|
|align=center|2
|align=center|1:20
|Newark, New Jersey, United States
|
|-
|Loss
|align=center|8–4
|Liz Carmouche
|Decision (unanimous)
|UFC Fight Night: Błachowicz vs. Santos 
|
|align=center|3
|align=center|5:00
|Prague, Czech Republic
|
|-
|Loss
|align=center|8–3
|Irene Aldana
|Decision (split)
|UFC 228 
|
|align=center|3
|align=center|5:00
|Dallas, Texas, United States
|
|-
|Win
|align=center|8–2
|Sarah Moras
|Decision (unanimous)
|UFC Fight Night: Cowboy vs. Medeiros 
|
|align=center|3
|align=center|5:00
|Austin, Texas, United States
|
|-
|Win
|align=center|7–2
|Ji Yeon Kim
|Decision (unanimous)
|UFC Fight Night: Holm vs. Correia
|
|align=center| 3
|align=center| 5:00
|Kallang, Singapore
|
|-
|Loss
|align=center|6–2
|Lina Länsberg
|Decision (unanimous)
|UFC Fight Night: Manuwa vs. Anderson
|
|align=center| 3
|align=center| 5:00
|London, England
|
|-
|Win
|align=center|6–1 
|Alexandra Buch
|Submission (guillotine choke)
|Clash FC: Clash of the Titans
|
|align=center| 1
|align=center| N/A
|Plzeň, Czech Republic
|
|-
|Win
|align=center|5–1 
|Eeva Siiskonen
|Submission (armbar)
|MMA Imatra: Carelia Fight 12
|
|align=center| 2
|align=center|4:06
|Imatra, Finland
|
|-
|Win
|align=center|4–1
|Melinda Fábián
|Decision (split)
|GCF 34: Back In The Fight 5
|
|align=center| 5
|align=center| 5:00
|Příbram, Czech Republic
|
|-
|Loss
|align=center|3–1
|Lina Länsberg
|Decision (unanimous)
|Battle of Botnia 2015
|
|align=center| 3
|align=center| 5:00
|Umeå, Sweden
|
|-
|Win
|align=center|3–0
|Suvi Salmimies
|Decision (split)
|Cage 31
|
|align=center| 3
|align=center| 5:00
|Helsinki, Finland
|
|-
|Win
|align=center|2–0
|Julija Stoliarenko
|TKO (corner stoppage)
|GCF Challenge: Back in the Fight 4
|
|align=center| 2
|align=center| 5:00
|Příbram, Czech Republic
|
|-
|Win
|align=center| 1–0
|Lenka Smetánková
|TKO (corner stoppage)
|GCF Challenge: Back in the Fight 3
|
|align=center| 1
|align=center| 3:00
|Příbram, Czech Republic
|
|-

|-
|Loss
|align=center|0–1
|Tereza Bledá
|Decision (unanimous)
|Oktagon Underground 3
|
|align=center|3
|align=center|3:00
|Prague, Czech Republic
|Oktagon Underground quarterfinals round.
|-

See also
 List of current UFC fighters
 List of female mixed martial artists

References

External links
 
 

1994 births
Living people
Czech female mixed martial artists
Bantamweight mixed martial artists
Mixed martial artists utilizing Muay Thai
Sportspeople from Příbram
Czech Muay Thai practitioners
Female Muay Thai practitioners
Ultimate Fighting Championship female fighters